War is the name of three fictional characters, who are supervillains appearing in American comic books published by Marvel Comics. Two are discussed here: both members of the Four Horsemen of Apocalypse. The first War (real name unknown) and Abraham Kieros. The title was also held by the mutant Gazer and, briefly, by Bruce Banner, the Hulk.

War (Abraham Kieros)

Publication history
War first appeared in X-Factor #11 (December 1986), and was created by Louise Simonson and Walter Simonson.

The character subsequently appears in X-Factor #15 (April 1987), #17 (June 1987), #19 (August 1987), #22-25 (November 1987-February 1988), Daredevil #252 (March 1988), X-Factor #26-27 (March–April 1988), X-Factor #84 (November 1992), The Uncanny X-Men #294–295 (November–December 1992), and Wolverine (vol. 2) #147 (February 2000).

War appeared as part of the "Apocalypse's Horsemen" entry in the Official Handbook of the Marvel Universe Update '89 #1.

Fictional character biography
Kieros was a young Vietnam War veteran who was paralyzed in combat. He was kept in a hospital and placed in an iron lung, but felt as though he was betrayed and forgotten by his country. Apocalypse appeared to him one day and offered him the ability to move and to get revenge on those who had tossed him aside. He accepted the offer and was indeed given the ability to move again, which allowed him to use his mutant power—the ability to create explosions through kinetic contact, usually by clapping his hands together—in Apocalypse's service as his Horseman of War. He often bickered with one of the other Horsemen, Famine, and disliked her total lack of obedience.

War liked to take control of situations and during their first confrontation with X-Factor, attempted to lead the other Horsemen. Famine and Pestilence refused to obey his orders and flew off to do their own business. Soon after, Death took over leadership and the Four Horsemen learned to ride as one. During the attack on Manhattan, War immediately attacked Cyclops and was later teleported back to the ship by Apocalypse, where he fought several more X-Factor members. He was eventually defeated by Iceman. Apocalypse then grabbed War and fled.

Later, during the X-Cutioner's Song story arc, War attacked Colossus and Iceman, but soon fled after Caliban grabbed Jean Grey and Cyclops, handing them over to Apocalypse, who was really Mr. Sinister in disguise. The X-Men sought out the Horsemen and War was presumably defeated in combat.

Much later, War appeared in an hospital, once again paralyzed from the neck down, apparently abandoned by Apocalypse who stripped him of his powers. Archangel, who had gained newfound powers and had been searching for Kieros, healed him of his wounds, giving him hope to start over with a new life.

Powers and abilities
Kieros is a mutant with the superhuman power to create explosions in his immediate area by clapping his hands. He does so by harnessing the minor kinetic force created when his hands strike each other, amplifying it to a significant degree, and redirecting it spatially so that it strikes and affects some other object in his line-of-sight, causing an explosive release of force. The limits of the range in which his power is effective have not yet been determined.

While a servant of Apocalypse, he used his sentient ship to construct for War a robot mount that resembles a demonic quadruped beast and that can travel on land or fly through the air and also was capable of teleportation.

War (Apocalypse vs. Dracula)

The earliest depiction of Apocalypse's Horseman, War. Not much is known about this incarnation of War. He was chosen by Apocalypse in the fifteenth century to become his horseman and lead his army, the Riders of the Dark. This army was so fierce and powerful that most people presumed it was just a myth used to scare soldiers before their first battle. It was no myth at all, and it precisely was what people thought it was, fierce and strong. In most of their battles, the only soldier who had to fight was War, who would single-handedly defeat hordes of men just by himself.

In 1459, the Riders of the Dark appeared in Romania where Vlad Ţepeş' army was fighting against the Ottomans and emerged victorious. Unfortunately for Vlad (who would become Dracula), War defeated Dracula's army. The survivors fled for their life, abandoning Dracula on the field who stood his ground and faced War but ultimately fell.

War (Gazer)

Gazer was a mutant astronaut, who after being depowered on M-Day, went out into space to die. Instead he was transported onto Apocalypse's ship and made to battle for the title of War, one of the Horsemen of Apocalypse. With Ozymandias' intervention, he was victorious, and through a torturous process became the newest incarnation of War.

Gazer was an astronaut permanently stationed alone on a NASA observation space station, due to the unusual metabolism he possessed as his mutant power, whereby he could absorb harmful radiation and process it to gain sustenance. He first encountered the X-Men when they used his station as a staging post for an attack on a group of non-sentient aliens which induced harmful emotions in humans.

Shortly afterwards, he lost his powers on M-Day, along with 90% of mutants. Succumbing to radiation sickness, he began to imagine that an experiment on the effects of radiation sickness was sentient (calling it "Phantom Torso"), and it constantly advised him to call NASA to ask for a return home. However, he remained until an alien resembling Doop, which he had built up to himself as his last hope, passed by his station on its way to crash-landing on Earth near Polaris, who'd seen it in space and had a similar reaction.

Thereafter, "Phantom Torso" stopped "talking" to him, and he put on a spacesuit and went out into space to die. However, he was teleported to Apocalypse's sphinx-like ship, and forced to battle Dr. Foster, a human archeologist who had stumbled upon Apocalypse's tomb, for the "right" to become War, Horseman of Apocalypse. Gazer would have lost the battle if it were not for Ozymandias, Apocalypse's servant. Ozymandias told Gazer that he would owe him and one day the scribe would become the master.

Gazer went through a terribly painful process where his skeleton was stretched, the former X-Man Sunfire, who was also chosen by Apocalypse to be a Horseman, tried to save him but Gazer had already been under Apocalypse's mind-control by then and helped recapture Shiro.

As War, Gazer was sent to battle the X-Men and Sentinel Squad O*N*E. Upon returning to Apocalypse's sphinx, he was approached by Ozymandias who wanted his debt repaid. War, no longer Gazer, did not fulfill his oath and instead revealed the truth to Apocalypse about Ozymandias' treachery.

During a heated battle against the X-Men, Ozymandias finally took his vengeance, stabbing Gazer from behind with a sword.

Powers and abilities
Before M-Day, Gazer, in addition to his unusual appearance, could absorb radiation at frequencies and levels which induce radiation sickness in normal humans and photosynthesize it as food.

After his depowerment on M-Day, he was taken by Apocalypse and transformed to possess super-strength and enhanced durability, and the ability to absorb and rechannel solar energy as blasts of fire through  his eyes. He also carries a spiked mace which flashes with electricity-like bursts, and rides a robotic horse-like flying machine.

Other versions

Age of Apocalypse
The original War (Kieros) appeared in the Age of Apocalypse as a member of Apocalypse's first wave of Horsemen. War was killed by Mikhail Rasputin when Apocalypse invaded Russia. Impressed by Mikhail's victory, Apocalypse captured and brainwashed Mikhail so he could join the  Horsemen of Apocalypse.

Mutant X
War also is seen in the Mutant X reality, where he constantly bickered with Death, but they had a mutual respect for each other.

In other media

Television
 The original War appeared in X-Men: The Animated Series, voiced by James Millington. In "Come the Apocalypse," where War was selected by Apocalypse and transformed into his Horseman; the second and third, "Beyond Good and Evil," Parts 3 and 4, where he fought alongside the other Horsemen when the X-Men sought out Apocalypse's Lazarus chamber. Instead of using his mutant abilities in the latter two episodes, he used an energy-projected sword. In his first appearance, he is shown not getting along with the woman who would become Pestilence, a nod to their disagreeable natures in the comics.

Film
 In X-Men: Apocalypse, Magneto is the horseman War.

References

Characters created by Clayton Henry
Characters created by Louise Simonson
Characters created by Walt Simonson
Comics characters introduced in 1986
Comics characters introduced in 2006
Comics set in the 15th century
Fictional axefighters
Fictional henchmen
Fictional NASA astronauts
Fictional Vietnam War veterans
Marvel Comics characters with superhuman strength
Marvel Comics mutants
Marvel Comics supervillains